Wolfgang Müller Kranefeldt (1892–1950) was a German psychiatrist, psychotherapist, and National Socialist, who was closely associated with Carl Jung. He was active in the AAGP and IAAGP in the 1930s and in 1936 joined the faculty of the Göring Institute (German Institute for Psychological Research and Psychotherapy) in Berlin. He was regarded as Jung's "leading pupil in Germany" and was analysed by Jung.

Selected publications
Die psychoanalyse: Psychoanalytische psychologie. W. de Gruyter & Co., Berlin & Leipzig, 1930.
Secret ways of the mind: A survey of the psychological principles of Freud, Adler, and Jung.

References 

1892 births
1950 deaths
German psychiatrists
Carl Jung